The Paint Rock River is a  tributary of the Tennessee River in northern Alabama in the United States. Its tributaries also drain a portion of south-central Tennessee.

The river is formed in northeastern Jackson County by the confluence of Estill Fork and Hurricane Creek, and flows generally southwardly, past the town of Paint Rock. In its upper course, the river flows through a deep valley cut into the Cumberland Plateau. In its lower course, the river is used to define part of the boundary between Madison and Marshall Counties.

See also
List of Alabama rivers

References

DeLorme (1998).  Alabama Atlas & Gazetteer.  Yarmouth, Maine: DeLorme.  .

External links
Paint Rock River Landscape Conservation Area, The Nature Conservancy

Rivers of Alabama
Tributaries of the Tennessee River
Huntsville-Decatur, AL Combined Statistical Area
Rivers of Jackson County, Alabama
Rivers of Madison County, Alabama
Rivers of Marshall County, Alabama